The ordination hall is a Buddhist building specifically consecrated and designated for the performance of the Buddhist ordination ritual (upasampada) and other ritual ceremonies, such as the recitation of the Patimokkha. The ordination hall is located within a boundary that defines "the space within which all members of a single local community have to assemble as a complete Sangha at a place appointed for ecclesiastical acts." The constitution of the sīmā is regulated and defined by the Vinaya and its commentaries and sub-commentaries.

Burmese ordination halls

In Burmese, ordination halls are called thein, derived from the Pali term , which means "boundary." The thein is a common feature of Burmese monasteries (kyaung), although the thein  may be not necessarily be located on the monastery compound itself. Shan ordination halls, called sim (သိမ်ႇ), are exclusively used for events limited to the monkhood.

The central importance of the ordination hall in the pre-colonial era is exemplified by the inclusion of an ordination hall, the Maha Pahtan Haw Shwe Ordination Hall (မဟာပဋ္ဌာန်းဟောရွှေသိမ်တော်ကြီး), as one of seven requisite edifices (နန်းတည်သတ္တဌာန) in the founding of Mandalay as a Burmese royal capital.

Thai ordination halls
In Thailand, ordination halls are called ubosot or bot, derived from the Pali term , meaning a hall used for rituals on uposatha ("Buddhist sabbath") days. The ubosot is the focal point of Central Thai temples, whereas the focal point of Northern Thai temples is the stupa. In Northeastern Thailand (Isan), ordination halls are known as sim, as they are in Laos. The ubosot, as the wat's principal building, is also used for communal services. 

The oldest bai sema date to the Dvaravati period. The sema stones stand above and mark the luk nimit, stone spheres buried at the cardinal points of the compass delineating the sacred area. A ninth stone sphere, usually bigger, is buried below the main Buddha image of the ubosot. The entrance sides of most ubosot face east. While wihan buildings also similarly house Buddha images, they differ from ubosot in that wihan are not marked by sema stones. Across from the entrance door at the end of the interior is the ubosot largest Buddha statue which is usually depicted in either the meditation attitude or the Maravijaya attitude.

See also 
 Upasampadā
 Vihāra
 Andaw-thein Temple
 Htukkanthein Temple
 Kalyani Ordination Hall
 Upali Ordination Hall

References

Further reading 
 Karl Döhring: Buddhist Temples Of Thailand. Berlin 1920, reprint by White Lotus Co. Ltd., Bangkok 2000, 
 K.I. Matics: Introduction To The Thai Temple. White Lotus, Bangkok 1992, 
 No Na Paknam: The Buddhist Boundary Markers of Thailand. Muang Boran Press, Bangkok 1981 (no ISBN)
 Carol Stratton: What's What in a Wat, Thai Buddhist Temples. Silkworm Books, Chiang Mai 2010, 

Buddhist architecture
Buddhist buildings
Buddhist monasticism
Thai Buddhist art and architecture